Richard Charles Lee (March 12, 1916 – February 2, 2003) (sometimes called "Mr. Urban America") was an American politician who served as the Mayor of New Haven from 1954 until 1970. He was a Democrat, and was the youngest mayor of the city had ever had at the time he entered office in 1954 at the age of 37.  Lee is best known for his leading role in urban redevelopment in the 1950s and 1960s.

Early life
Richard Charles Lee was born on March 12, 1916. He grew up in a cold-water apartment in the working-class Newhallville neighborhood of New Haven. His father, Frederick, worked at the Winchester Repeating Arms Company. He graduated from Hillhouse High School in 1934.

Career 
After being defeated for mayor in 1949 and 1951, he won in 1953. Lee appointed the city's first black corporation counsel, George Williamson Crawford, in 1954.

During his first re-election campaign in 1957, John F. Kennedy, then a member of the United States Senate, traveled to New Haven to campaign for him. To shore up New Haven's large Italian-American electorate, the mayor brought in Rocky Marciano, the boxer. He won that election by a 2-to-1 margin.

Lee went on to serve 16 years as mayor, second-longest of New Haven's mayors at the time. In 2003, he died at the age of 86.

In 1962 and 1963, Lee served as the president of the United States Conference of Mayors.

Legacy 
On May 17, 1999, Congresswoman Rosa DeLauro (D-CT) dedicated the Richard C. Lee United States Courthouse in downtown New Haven to Lee. DeLauro worked with Senators Christopher Dodd and Joseph Lieberman to rename the federal building, which stands at 141 Church Street. The Richard C. Lee Highway, a freeway in downtown New Haven, is also named in his honor.

A former New Haven public high school, carried the name Richard C. Lee High School in his honor; it has been replaced by Career Magnet High School. The Richard C. Lee High School building became the Yale School of Nursing and now houses a variety of Yale Medical School offices.

References
General
Paul Von Zielbauer, Richard C. Lee, 86, Mayor Who Revitalized New Haven, The New York Times, February 4, 2003
Notes

External links 

 Richard Charles Lee papers (MS 318). Manuscripts and Archives, Yale University Library.

1916 births
2003 deaths
Mayors of New Haven, Connecticut
20th-century American politicians
Connecticut Democrats
People from New Haven, Connecticut
Presidents of the United States Conference of Mayors